ACIA may refer to:

 Arctic Climate Impact Assessment, a study
 Asynchronous Communications Interface Adapter, integrated circuits like MOS6551 and MC6850
 American Committee for Armenian Independence, an early 20th-century support organization
 ASEAN Comprehensive Investment Agreement, an agreement signed by ten ASEAN countries on February 26, 2009, to further liberalize investment regimes with the end goal of the AEC

Not to be confused with:

 Açaí palm, of which the Açaí Berry is the fruit